The Little Black River (French: Rivière Noire) is a river flowing in the south of Quebec (Canada) and in the north of Maine (United States).

Geography 

From its source, in Témiscouata RCM, Quebec, the river runs East and Southeast across the Canada–United States border in Maine Township 19, Range 12, WELS, to the Saint John River at Allagash, Maine.

The Little Black River flows over  especially in forest areas.

Upper course of the river in Quebec (segment of  designated Black River)

From its source, the river flows on:

 to the East, to the outlet of "Lac du Cinq" (Lake Five);
 to the Southeast, to the bridge of the Moulin Théberge Lake;
 to the Southeast, crossing the "Lac Noir" (Black Lake) which is surrounded by a marsh area, up to the border between Quebec (Canada) and Maine (United States).

Lower course of the river in Maine (segment of  designated Little Black River)

From the border between Quebec and Maine, the Little Black river flows on:

  to the South, to the confluence of the West Branch Little Black River (Quebec–Maine) (from the West);
  to the South, to the confluence of the Campbell Branch Little Black River (from the Southwest);
  to the Southeast, until Rocky Brook (from the North);
  to the East, passing South of Boat Landing Mountain until Hofey Brook (from the North);
  Southward collecting the waters of Little Brook Hafey until Knowland Brook (from the Southwest);
  to the Southeast, winding up Carrie Bogan Brook (from the Southwest);
  to the Southeast, passing between two sets of high mountains (including the Johnson Mountain Brook Kelly Brook and Mountain), to the confluence of the river

The confluence of the Black River ("Little Black River") is located in Allagash, Maine, in Aroostook County, either:

  downstream from the St. Clair Island (St Clair Island);
  upstream of the confluence of the Allagash River (from the Southwest);
  Southeast of the border between Quebec and Maine.

See also

Saint-Athanase, Quebec, a municipality
Allagash, Maine, a town
Témiscouata Regional County Municipality, a RCM in Quebec
Aroostook County, a county in Maine
Saint John River (Bay of Fundy), a stream
West Branch Little Black River (Quebec–Maine), a stream
Campbell Branch Little Black River
List of rivers of Maine
List of rivers of Quebec

References

Maine Streamflow Data from the USGS
Maine Watershed Data From Environmental Protection Agency

External links 

Rivers of Bas-Saint-Laurent
Tributaries of the Saint John River (Bay of Fundy)
Rivers of Aroostook County, Maine
North Maine Woods
International rivers of North America